James Lick High School is a public high school in San Jose, California, US, located in the Alum Rock district of East San Jose. The school is part of the East Side Union High School District.

History

James Lick High School opened in 1950 at the base of the East Foothills of San Jose; orchards and open land surrounded the established residential area. Its reach included homes in the Foothills overlooking the entire breadth of Santa Clara Valley. The land had been part of a proposed site for the city's airport in 1928.

It was the first of 11 comprehensive, traditional high schools in the East Side Union High School District, and it quickly became the standard for educational quality in the emerging district. The school built a tradition of excellence in the classroom and on the athletic fields. For many years after its opening, James Lick was viewed as the "jewel" at the base of the foothills.

The community surrounding James Lick changed much in the subsequent decades, as orchards were replaced with apartment complexes and single family homes. As the community changed, so did the make-up of its student body. After decades as a recognized leader among comprehensive high schools, it entered a period of decline. In the 1990s, a high rate of turnover developed in the school's population and standardized scores declined precipitously.

In 1999, James Lick was declared "an underperforming school". Many families, concerned about academic quality and issues of school safety, removed their students by way of the "No Child Left Behind" legislation. The surrounding area, during the economic decline of recent years, became a haven for families seeking affordable places to live. Concurrently, many first-time homeowners found themselves in the county's epicenter of foreclosure. Even after some easing of that housing crisis, the neighborhood of James Lick High School still held Santa Clara County's top foreclosure rate out of 226 neighborhoods in 2012.

Athletics 

The number of students participating in James Lick High School's athletic programs has grown, along with their success on the field. James Lick offers 14 distinct sports: cross country, American football, boys' and girls' volleyball, boys' and girls' soccer, boys' and girls' basketball, wrestling, softball, baseball, badminton, track and field, swimming and diving.

In the 2011–12 school year, 458 students participated in a sports program – 273 boys and 185 girls. This reflects the increased number of on-site coaches, improved sports and locker room facilities for girls and the presence of an athletic director keen on improving the professionalism and performance of its athletes and coaches.

In the 2013–14 school year, the boys' soccer team wonthe league title for the first time since 1967. Showing immense skill and dedication, the team advanced into the quarter-finals of the CCS championships, defeating Greenfield High School 2–1 in overtime. This  run continued until the team finally lost to the #1 seed, Half Moon Bay High School. The boys' and girls' basketball teams were also successful that year, both advancing to CCS. This was the basketball girls first visit to the CCS level of competition since 2008.

Academic 
Academic Performance Index (API) scores improved from 588 in the 2006–07 school year to 674 in 2011–12 . Today, consistent with James Lick's recovered vision of moving all students forward to success, its ongoing focus is on all learning communities—to meet them where they are and move them toward greater achievement.

Crucial to James Lick's rise in recent years are the specific steps it has taken, developing a college-going culture, emphasizing graduation and A-G compliance as preparation for post-high school study. A continuing effort has been made to increase both the number of AP classes and the number of students enrolled in upper division courses.

AP courses
According to U.S. News & World Report in 2022, the Advanced Placement (AP) participation rate is 67%. The AP participation passing rate is 44%.

For the 2018–2019 school year, James Lick High School offered the following AP courses:
AP Calculus AB
AP Chemistry
AP Computer Science A
AP English Language and Composition
AP English Literature and Composition
AP Psychology
AP Spanish Language and Culture
AP Spanish Literature and Culture
AP Statistics
AP United States History
AP World History
AP Studio Art 2D and Drawing
AP United States Government and Politics
AP United States History
AP World History

Testing at James Lick 
Student performance on the California High School Exit Exam has improved notably at James Lick High School. Students are prepared via support classes, after-school support and targeted instruction to CAHSEE standards in order to test proficient on the exam as sophomores. In 2011–12, 76% of students taking the mathematics portion of the CAHSEE passed, a 16% increase from the 2006–07 passing rate of 60%. Among students taking the English portion of the CAHSEE, 74% passed in 2011–12, a 14% increase from the 2006–07 passing rate of 60%.

Fire Safety Pathway Vocational Program 
The school's Fire Service Pathway prepares participants for entry-level positions in the fire protective industry such as fire fighter, emergency medical technician, paramedic, fire inspector and fire investigator. After successful completion of the fire service pathway and graduation, students have the opportunity to:

Attend a CSU/UC campus to pursue a bachelor's degree
Attend community college to pursue an associate degree
Attend other certification programs
Apply for an apprenticeship opportunity
 
Program Highlights
CPAT Training
Fieldtrips
Wilderness First Aid
CSU Eligibility
CPR First Aid Certification
Fire Service Networking
Community Involvement
Emergency Medical Technician Test Preparation and Certification
Post-Secondary Employment Opportunities

Demographics 
James Lick High School serves working class and predominantly low-income, first and second-generation immigrant families. In 2011–12, 46% of students submitted qualifying applications for the free and reduced lunch program, although the actual percentage of low-income families is much higher. Stigma regarding free and reduced lunch status, as well as concerns regarding "documentation", affect this reported percentage. Between 2006–07 and 2011–12, enrollment grew from 1,055 to 1,416 and student achievement grew from 588 to 674 API points, confirming that just as a community changes over 60 years, so can a school enhance its instructional delivery and services, honoring the demands and goals of those it serves. The James Lick staff continues to embrace this challenge.

In the 2006–07 school year, out of 1,055 students, 77.1% were of Hispanic descent, 8.3% White, 7.4% Asian, 4.1% Filipino, 2.1% African American and 0.5% American Indian.

In the 2011–12 school year, out of 1,416 students, 74% of all students were of Hispanic descent, 7% White, 15% Asian, 2% African American and 1% American Indian.

Controversy 
In April 2018, the school proposed cutting its physics science program for the 2018–2019 school year and letting students interested in taking that class look at other high schools. This would prevent graduates from being accepted to University of California colleges that recommend students have three years of core science (physics, chemistry and biology). A petition to reverse the decision was started by members of the Northern California/ Nevada Section of the American Association of Physics Teachers.

Graduation 
The emphasis on graduation and moving on to post-high school success has increased, along with the percentage of seniors who graduate. 2012 was the first year since 2004 when over 200 seniors graduated. The number of students meeting A-G requirements hit a new high in 2011–12 with 93 students eligible, 73 of whom applied and were accepted by four-year colleges and universities.

While the percentage of seniors graduating from James Lick High School has increased, the one- and four-year dropout rates for students must be acknowledged. Since the 2007–08 school year, ever-fewer students have dropped out. In 2009–10, the one-year dropout rate was 3.3% and the four-year rate was 16.4%. Credit recovery programs, scheduling supports and summer programs allow students to earn additional credits during the last two years of their enrollment at James Lick.

Notable alumni
 Leon Donohue, NFL offensive lineman
 Forrest Fezler, PGA Tour golfer
 Chon Gallegos, NFL quarterback
 Melissa Haro, Sports Illustrated Swimsuit Issue model
 Dan Lloyd, NFL linebacker
 Roger Maltbie, professional golfer and sportscaster
 Jim Plunkett, NFL quarterback and Heisman Trophy winner
 Jeanne Wakatsuki Houston, author of Farewell to Manzanar
 Luis Valdez, playwright and film director
 Mark Leon, Robotics Alliance Project, NASA Ames Research Center

See also

Santa Clara County high schools

References

East Side Union High School District
Educational institutions established in 1950
High schools in San Jose, California
Public high schools in California
1950 establishments in California